Gagitodes is a genus of moths in the family Geometridae described by Warren in 1893. It is considered a synonym of Perizoma by some authors.

Selected species
 Gagitodes omnifasciaria (Inoue, 1998)
 Gagitodes parvaria (Leech, 1891)
 Gagitodes sagittata (Fabricius, 1787) - marsh carpet

References

Perizomini